The Carnegie Library Building  is an historic building in Athens, Georgia. It was one of many such libraries donated by Andrew Carnegie which were named Carnegie Library after him. Funds were donated on March 5, 1905, and construction was completed in 1910 on the site of the State Normal School.  On November 11, 1975, it was added to the U.S. National Register of Historic Places.

It was used as the Navy Supply Corps Museum when the campus was the base of the Navy Supply Corps School.

The University of Georgia has renovated the building, which now houses a part of the university libraries. It has been given the name, Carnegie Library Learning Center.

Services
The Carnegie Library primarily serves as an electronic library. Wi-fi access is available to students and faculty with a UGA login. The library provides computer workstations as well as printer and scanner access. It also provides “Bulldog Bikes” for students to check out for traveling around campus.

The Carnegie Library does not have its own print collection. However, students and faculty are allowed to drop off and pick up books and periodicals from the library's location.

Hours of operation

The Carnegie Library Learning Center is open during the regular academic year on Mondays through Thursdays from 9am to 10 pm and Sundays from 2 pm to 10 pm, and is closed on Fridays and holidays.  Summer semester hours are Mondays through Fridays from 9am to 6pm.

References

External links

 Clarke County listings at National Register of Historic Places
 History of the Carnegie Library building

Library buildings completed in 1900
Buildings and structures in Athens, Georgia
Athens, Georgia
University of Georgia campus
Libraries on the National Register of Historic Places in Georgia (U.S. state)
National Register of Historic Places in Clarke County, Georgia